Empower may refer to:
 EMPOWER, a Thai organization supporting sex workers
 Empower (agency), a US advertising and marketing agency
 EmPower (aircraft power adapter), a standard for 15-volt direct current power outlets in passenger airplanes
 Empower (emergy), the flow of emergy (embodied energy)
 Empower (financial services), a US financial holding company

See also
 Empower America, a conservative think tank in the United States
 Empower Orphans, a US non-profit organization
 Empower Playgrounds, a US company that designs playground systems
 Empowered, an original English-language manga
 Empowerment